Afton High School is located in the town of Afton, Oklahoma, United States.  Its mascot is the eagle and it has an enrollment of 156 students.

References

Public high schools in Oklahoma
Schools in Ottawa County, Oklahoma